B Street or "B" Street is the second of a sequence of alphabetical streets in many cities.

It may refer to:
Constitution Avenue, Washington, D.C., known originally and also as B Street
Independence Avenue (Washington, D.C.), also known as B Street South, or South B Street
B Street Theatre, Sacramento, California
B Street District, Livingston, Montana, a historic district listed on the National Register of Historic Places

See also
Avenue B (disambiguation)